Arganiella is a species of very small freshwater snail with an operculum, an aquatic operculate gastropod mollusks in the family Hydrobiidae.

Species
Species in the genus Arganiella include:
Arganiella exilis (Paladilhe, 1867)

References

Hydrobiidae
Taxonomy articles created by Polbot